The  is the 26th edition of the Japan Academy Film Prize, an award presented by the Nippon Academy-Sho Association to award excellence in filmmaking. It awarded the best films of 2002 and it took place on March 7, 2003 at the Grand Prince Hotel New Takanawa in Tokyo, Japan.

Nominees

Awards

References

External links 
  - 
 Complete list of awards and nominations for the 26th Japan Academy Prize - 

Japan Academy Film Prize
2003 in Japanese cinema
Japan Academy Film Prize
March 2003 events in Japan